Birmingham City Women F.C. is an English women's football club affiliated with Birmingham City F.C. As founding members of the FA Women's Super League in 2011, the team currently plays in the second-highest division of women's football in England. The team plays their home games at St Andrew's, the home of Birmingham City F.C.

History
The club was formed in 1968 by a group of female fans who played local friendly matches until 1970. They joined the Heart of England League in 1970, and played in the league until 1973 when it underwent a major restructure and become known as the West Midland Regional League in 1974. The club were successful during this period, winning these leagues five times during the entire 1970s and 1980s (1971–72, 1974–75, 1976–77, 1987–88, 1988–89), amongst other trophies. They reached the semi-final of the Women's FA Cup in 1974 and 1988.

The club ran into difficult times during the 1990s, with many staff and player changes. In an effort to regain stability they created an academy of young players, many who eventually played for the senior team.

In 1998 Birmingham City were elevated to the newly created Midland Combination League and in their first season won the league, gaining automatic promotion into the FA Women's Premier League Northern Division. After two seasons, Birmingham were promoted to the top flight of women's football in England, joining the FA Women's Premier League National Division in 2002. Also in 2001–02 Birmingham upset Doncaster Belles 4–3 in the FA Women's Premier League Cup semi-final. In the final at Adams Park, Wycombe, Birmingham were thrashed 7–1 by full-time professional Fulham Ladies.

In March 2003, local sports reporter Gary Newbon criticised women's football and bet the club £500 that they could not attract 500 supporters to their upcoming match against Doncaster Belles. Humiliated Newbon lost his bet. The academy had begun to produce players for the first team at this point, and Laura Bassett became the first Birmingham City Ladies player, from the academy or otherwise, to appear for England at full international level.

The club's high-profile manager of the time, Marcus Bignot, signed big name players including Rachel Yankey and Alex Scott for the 2004–05 season and Birmingham finished fourth. The club ran into financial problems when Karren Brady of Birmingham City's men reneged on a letter of intent to provide funding. The female club had to let major players go before the start of the 2005–06 season, which they finished in sixth position. They were only able to continue after a player's parent donated £10,000.

Also in 2005, the club's junior sides joined the newly formed Centre of Excellence league in the Central Warwickshire area. Birmingham won their eighth consecutive Birmingham FA County Cup in 2008 before a number of established players either retired from the game or moved on to other clubs. They began to rebuild and finished 2008–09 in fifth place (losing out on fourth place only through inferior goal difference). Also in 2005 the club left Redditch United's The Valley Stadium for Stratford Town's DCS Stadium.

FA WSL era 
In March 2010 the club was announced as a founder member of the FA WSL. The club's successful application was underwritten by Birmingham City's controversial new owner Carson Yeung. In December 2010, Birmingham City announced the signing of several international players to their WSL squad. In June 2011 the Centre of Excellence's future was secured with the allocation of a new FA licence for 2011–12 season onwards; which realigned the current development pathway for women's football in England.

The club became inaugural members of the newly formed FA WSL in 2011 and came close to winning it at the first attempt, leading for most of the campaign before being overhauled by Arsenal. They also reached the Continental Cup Final but once again found Arsenal in the way at Burton Albion F.C. The season was notable for the goalscoring exploits of Rachel Williams who scored the league's first ever hat-trick, finished as leading scorer and won the FA Players' Player of the Year Award.

Due to their 2nd-place finish in the 2011 FA WSL Birmingham qualified for a place in the 2012–13 UEFA Women's Champions League round of 32 for the first time in their history. Drawn against Italians Bardolino Verona, Birmingham won the first leg 2–0 but lost 3–0 at the Stadio Marc'Antonio Bentegodi, after extra time, to exit the competition at the first hurdle.

In May 2012 the club won their first FA Women's Cup, beating Chelsea on penalties in the final at Ashton Gate in Bristol. Also in 2012, for the second consecutive year, the club finished 2nd in the FA WSL and were runners-up in the Continental Cup Final, both to Arsenal. The 2nd-place finish in the league qualified Birmingham for the 2013–14 UEFA Women's Champions League round of 32.

Birmingham defeated PK-35 Vantaa and Zorky Krasnogorsk to qualify for an all-English quarter-final against Arsenal. A 1–0 win at home and a 2–0 win in London sent the club through to a semi-final against Tyresö FF. Birmingham manager David Parker described big-spending Tyresö as female "galácticos" before the tie, which the Swedes won 3–0 on aggregate. The club underwent another stadium change in 2014, leaving the DCS Stadium for Solihull Moors' The Autotech Stadium.

Integration with men's side 
The club became fully integrated into men's side Birmingham City Football Club in November 2016. Prior to the 2017 FA WSL Spring Series, long-time manager David Parker resigned. The club's Regional Talent Club technical director Marc Skinner was promoted to first-team manager shortly thereafter.

The Blues finished 5th in the 2017/2018 season, narrowly missing out on 4th on the final day of the season with a draw against Reading, with Ellen White finishing as highest scorer in the league with 15 goals. Freda Ayisi, Coral-Jade Haines and Maddy Cusack were released shortly after.

In July 2018, the club rebranded as Birmingham City Women F.C. Marc Skinner left in January 2019, to take the head coach job at American National Women's Soccer League (NWSL) club Orlando Pride. He was replaced by Marta Tejedor.

On 3 March 2020, the club parted ways with manager Marta Tejedor by mutual consent and promoted Charlie Baxter to the position of interim head coach. The club finished the 2019—2020 season second from bottom, having lost major stars like Ellen White and Hayley Ladd, as well as upcoming talent like Aoife Mannion to other WSL clubs in the summer transfer window. On 13 August 2020, Birmingham appointed former Sheffield United manager Carla Ward as the new permanent head coach.

In April 2021, the clubs players formally issued a list of complaints to the club's board, stating that the club was "preventing us from performing our jobs to the best of our ability."

Former Glasgow City boss Scott Booth was appointed as Head Coach in July 2021, but a winless start to the season saw him lose his job in November. He was subsequently replaced by former Birmingham City midfielder Darren Carter, who became Interim Head Coach. Despite their best efforts, Birmingham were relegated from the Women's Super League with one game to spare, after a 6-0 defeat away to Manchester City.

Kit
In 2013, a deal was signed with Italian kit manufacturer Legea, who also supplied North Korea, Iran and Zimbabwe. In early 2014, the club announced that Sondico would be the kit supplier until the end of 2015. On 7 March 2016 it was announced that Adidas was taking over as the club's kit supplier for the next four seasons.

Honours
For a detailed international record see English women's football clubs in international competitions

FA Women's Super League
Runners up: 2011, 2012

Women's FA Cup
Winners: 2011/12
Runners up: 2017

FA Women's League Cup
Runners up: 2011, 2012

FA Women's National League Cup
Runners up: 2001/02

Heart of England League
Champions: 1971/72

West Midland Regional League
Champions: 1974/75, 1976/77, 1987/88, 1988/89

Midland Combination Women's Football League
Champions: 1998/99

FA Women's National League North
Champions: 2001/02

First-team squad

Club officials

Front office
 General manager: Sarah Westwood
 Operations coordinator: Kyle Adams

Coaching staff
 Head coach: Darren Carter
 Assistant head coach: Jo Potter
 Lead Goalkeeping coach: Tony Elliott
 Lead physiotherapist: David Merlin
 Sports rehabilitator: Beth Watkins
 Performance Analyst: Thomas Carter
 Head of Sports Science: Lewis Gordon

See also
 Current and former Birmingham City W.F.C. players
 List of women's association football clubs in England and Wales
 Women's football in England
 List of women's association football clubs

References

External links

 
Women
Women's football clubs in England
Football clubs in Birmingham, West Midlands
Association football clubs established in 1968
1968 establishments in England
FA WSL 1 teams
FA Women's National League teams